The men's team table tennis event at the 2019 Pan American Games was held between the 8th and 10th of August at the Polideportivo 3 located at the Villa Deportiva Nacional Videna in Lima, Peru.

Schedule
All times are PET (UTC-5).

Results

Round Robin
The round robin will be used as a qualification round. The twelve teams will be split into groups of three. The top two teams from each group will advance to the first round of playoffs.

Group 1

Group 2

Group 3

Group 4

Playoffs

Final classification

References
 Results Book

Table tennis at the 2019 Pan American Games